Nganglam  or Nanglam  is a town in south-eastern Bhutan. It is located in Pema Gatshel District.

Population 1,018 (2005 census). The postal code of Nganglam Post Office is 44102.

References

Populated places in Bhutan
Bhutan–India border crossings